Raimund Haberl (born 29 August 1949) is an Austrian rower. He competed in the men's single sculls event at the 1984 Summer Olympics.

References

External links
 

1949 births
Living people
Austrian male rowers
Olympic rowers of Austria
Rowers at the 1984 Summer Olympics
People from Zistersdorf
Sportspeople from Lower Austria
World Rowing Championships medalists for Austria